Coptodon snyderae is a critically endangered species of fish in the cichlid family. It is endemic to Lake Bermin in Cameroon. It is threatened by pollution and sedimentation from human activities, and potentially also by large emissions of carbon dioxide (CO2) from the lake's bottom (compare Lake Nyos), although Bermin is too shallow to contain very high amounts of this gas. The specific name of this cichlid honours Alexandra Snyder (b. 1953), a museum collection manager, whose assistance in the field contributed to the success of Wallace J. Dominey's 1985 expedition to Lake Bermin, Cameroon.

References

snyderae
Freshwater fish of Cameroon
Endemic fauna of Cameroon
Lake fish of Africa
Fish described in 1992
Taxonomy articles created by Polbot
Taxobox binomials not recognized by IUCN